Papa's Tomato Pies is a historic pizzeria selling Trenton tomato pies in New Jersey. It was founded by Giuseppe "Joe" Papa in 1912 on South Clinton Avenue in Trenton, New Jersey. Papa's is the oldest family owned and longest continuously operating pizzeria in the United States. Papa's is the second oldest pizzeria in the United States after Lombardi's Pizza, but Lombardi's closed for a decade from 1984 to 1994 and was reopened under new management.

History

Papa's Tomato Pies was established by Giuseppe "Joe" Papa in 1912 on South Clinton Avenue in Trenton and a few years later, moved to Butler Street. In 1945, the restaurant moved to Chambers Street and then, in 2013, moved again to Robbinsville-Allentown Road in Robbinsville, New Jersey. Papa learned the trade from Joe's Tomato Pies, which opened in 1910, before opening his own restaurant. Joe's closed in the late 1980s.

Joe Papa's daughter, Teresa "Tessie" Papa and her husband Dominik "Abie" Azzaro eventually took over operations in the 1960s. During the 1950s and 60s Papa's would remain open until 3 am serving late workers and patrons who just left local bars.

Papa's is currently operated by Joe Papa's grandson, Nick Azzaro, a third generation Italian-American. Azzaro has been making pizza for over fifty years and has worked for Papa's since he was 14.

Ratings

In 2010, Papa's won the Munchmobile Pizza Patrol awards for the six best pizzas in New Jersey, winning the Award of Excellence.

In 2012, Papa's was ranked one of the 35 Best Pizzas in America.

See also

De Lorenzo's Tomato Pies
Antica Pizzeria Port'Alba, oldest pizzeria in the world

References

External links

Companies based in Trenton, New Jersey
Restaurants in New Jersey
Pizzerias in the United States
1912 establishments in New Jersey
Restaurants established in 1912
Robbinsville Township, New Jersey